A Sister's Love is a 1912 American short silent drama film directed by D. W. Griffith and starring Blanche Sweet.

Cast
 Wilfred Lucas
 Dorothy Bernard
 Blanche Sweet

See also
 D. W. Griffith filmography
 Blanche Sweet filmography

References

External links

1912 films
American silent short films
American black-and-white films
1912 drama films
Films directed by D. W. Griffith
1912 short films
Silent American drama films
1910s American films